Madera Highlands is an unincorporated community in Madera County, California. It lies at an elevation of 269 feet (82 m).

References

Unincorporated communities in California
Unincorporated communities in Madera County, California